Yong Duk Jhun (born 1971) is a director, cinematographer and animator. He is a director at Paramount Animation and was head of layout at DreamWorks Animation. He is best known for his work on Kung Fu Panda (2008), Shrek Forever After (2010) and Trolls (2016).

Filmography
 Jonah: A VeggieTales Movie (2002) - layout artist
 Father of the Pride (2004-2005, 14 episodes) - layout artist
 Over the Hedge (2006) - rough layout artist, animatic
 Kung Fu Panda (2008) - cinematographer, head of layout
 Monsters vs. Aliens (2009) - layout artist
 Shrek Forever After (2010) - cinematographer, head of layout
 The Croods (2013) - cinematographer, head of layout
 Kung Fu Panda 3 (2016) - layout artist
 Trolls (2016) - cinematographer, head of layout
 Ferdinand (2017) - layout adviser
 Spies in Disguise (2019) - layout adviser
 Vivo (2021) - head of cinematography-layout
 Star Trek: Prodigy (2021) - assistant director
 The Tiger's Apprentice (2024) - co-director

References

External links

Living people
1971 births
South Korean cinematographers
South Korean animators
People from Seoul
DreamWorks Animation people
University of Seoul alumni
School of Visual Arts alumni